Always Ascending is the fifth studio album by Scottish indie rock band Franz Ferdinand. It was released on 9 February 2018 through the Domino Recording Company. It is the band's first non-collaborative album in over four years, following Right Thoughts, Right Words, Right Action (2013). It is also their first album to feature new member Julian Corrie, who joined shortly after the departure of Nick McCarthy, and their last to feature drummer Paul Thomson. The album received generally positive reviews from critics. It peaked at number three in Scotland and number six in the UK. Four singles were released from the album: "Always Ascending", "Feel the Love Go", "Lazy Boy" and an alternative version of "Glimpse of Love".

Background and recording
Following the release of Right Thoughts, Right Words, Right Action, the band's fourth studio album, in August 2013, the band collaborated with American rock band Sparks under the name FFS. They released a self-titled album in July 2015 and briefly toured. In July 2016, it was announced that Nick McCarthy, one of the band's founding members, was taking a break from the band to spend more time with family and focusing on side projects. It was announced in May 2017 that two new members had joined the band; Dino Bardot, former guitarist for Scottish indie rock band 1990s, and music producer Julian Corrie. Corrie joined the band for the recording sessions of the album, while Bardot joined after recording was completed.

The band recorded the album at Motorbass Studios in Paris and RAK Studios in London. They previously used RAK Studios to record FFS in late 2014. For Always Ascending, they worked alongside Philippe Zdar, one-half of French synthpop duo Cassius and frequent collaborator with French indie pop band Phoenix, on the album.

Composition
The music of Always Ascending has been described as indie rock, dance-punk, and new wave, all genres that the band have been previously associated with.

Promotion and release
Prior to the announcement of the album, the band shared a short snippet of the title track on social media platforms on 23 October 2017. On 25 October, the band released the title track as the album's lead single. Alongside the release was the reveal of the album's title, artwork, and track listing. They also released dates for a world tour, starting in October 2017 and ending in May 2018. A music video for the title track, directed by AB/CD/CD, was released on 4 December. On 8 January 2018, "Feel the Love Go" was premiered on Zane Lowe's radio show on Beats 1. A music video was also released on the same day and made exclusive to the Apple Music service. The video was directed by Diane Martel, who had previously directed the band's music videos for "Do You Want To" and "Evil Eye". On 25 January, "Lazy Boy" was released as a single.

The album was released on physical and digital formats on 9 February 2018 by the Domino Recording Company. It was made available on 12" vinyl, CD, and a limited edition cassette. A bundle was also made available which included a 180 gram blue and white marble-colored vinyl and other special merchandise items, limited to 1,500 copies. The Japanese CD edition of the album was released through Hostess Entertainment and featured the band's non-album single "Demagogue" (2016) from 30 Days, 30 Songs as a bonus track.

Critical reception

Always Ascending received generally positive reviews from critics. On review aggregator site Metacritic, the album holds an average critic score of 72/100, based on 26 reviews. At the online review aggregator Any Decent Music?, the album received an average critic score of 6.7/10, based on 31 reviews.

Track listing

Personnel
All personnel adapted from liner notes.

Franz Ferdinand
Alex Kapranos
Bob Hardy
Paul Thomson  
Julian Corrie

Additional musicians
Terry Edwards – saxophone 

Technical personnel
Mike Horner – additional production
Pierre Juarez – additional production
Mike Marsh – mastering
Sam Potter – extra contribution 
Antoine Poyeton – assistant at Motorbass Studios
Will Purton – assistant at RAK Studios
Philippe Zdar – production, mixing

Other personnel
Melissa Appleton – Infinity Mirror construction
Edwin Burdis – coordination
Cerne Canning – management
Matthew Cooper – design
Sylvan Deleu – photography
David Edwards – band collage photos
Franz Ferdinand – design
Alexis Anne Mackenzie – cover art, band collages
Nicola Wright – assistant manager

Charts

Release history

References

2018 albums
Franz Ferdinand (band) albums
Domino Recording Company albums
New wave albums by Scottish artists